The Union Colliery Company was a bituminous coal mining company based in St. Louis Missouri.  The company had branch offices in Milwaukee, Racine, and Kenosha,
Wisconsin, as well as Detroit, Michigan.

The company was acquired in 1937 by East St. Louis Light and Power.  This company eventually became Union Electric Company.  It remained a subsidiary until ceasing operations in June, 1958.

Mines

The company operated the following mines:
 Kathleen, Dowell, IL

Labor relations

See also

References

Coal companies of the United States
Defunct mining companies of the United States
Defunct companies based in Missouri
Defunct coal mining companies
Defunct energy companies of the United States
1937 mergers and acquisitions